In classical mechanics, Euler's rotation equations are a vectorial quasilinear first-order ordinary differential equation describing the rotation of a rigid body, using a rotating reference frame with angular velocity ω whose axes are fixed to the body. Their general vector form is

where M is the applied torques and I is the inertia matrix.
The vector  is the angular acceleration. Note that all quantities are defined in the rotating reference frame.

In orthogonal principal axes of inertia coordinates the equations become

where Mk are the components of the applied torques, Ik are the principal moments of inertia and ωk are the components of the angular velocity.

Derivation
In an inertial frame of reference (subscripted "in"), Euler's second law states that the time derivative of the angular momentum L equals the applied torque:

For point particles such that the internal forces are central forces, this may be derived using Newton's second law. 
For a rigid body, one has the relation between angular momentum and the moment of inertia Iin given as 

In the inertial frame, the differential equation is not always helpful in solving for the motion of a general rotating rigid body, as both Iin and ω can change during the motion. One may instead change to a coordinate frame fixed in the rotating body, in which the moment of inertia tensor is constant. Using a reference frame such as that at the center of mass, the frame's position drops out of the equations.
In any rotating reference frame, the time derivative must be replaced so that the equation becomes

and so the cross product arises, see time derivative in rotating reference frame. 
The vector components of the torque in the rotating and the inertial frames are related by

where Q is the rotation tensor (not rotation matrix), an orthogonal tensor related to the angular velocity vector by 
 
for any vector u.

Now  is substituted and the time derivatives are taken in the rotating frame, while realizing that the particle positions and the inertia tensor does not depend on time. This leads to the general vector form of Euler's equations which are valid in such a frame

The equations are also derived from Newton's laws in the discussion of the resultant torque.

Principal axes form
When choosing a frame so that its axes are aligned with the principal axes of the inertia tensor, its component matrix is diagonal, which further simplifies calculations. As described in the moment of inertia article, the angular momentum L can then be written

Also in some frames not tied to the body can it be possible to obtain such simple (diagonal tensor) equations for the rate of change of the angular momentum. Then ω must be the angular velocity for rotation of that frames axes instead of the rotation of the body. It is however still required that the chosen axes are still principal axes of inertia. The resulting form of the Euler rotation equations is useful for rotation-symmetric objects that allow some of the principal axes of rotation to be chosen freely.

Special case solutions

Torque-free precessions
Torque-free precessions are non-trivial solution for the situation where the torque on the right hand side is zero. When I is not constant in the external reference frame (i.e. the body is moving and its inertia tensor is not constantly diagonal) then I cannot be pulled through the derivative operator acting on L. In this case I(t) and ω(t) do change together in such a way that the derivative of their product is still zero. This motion can be visualized by Poinsot's construction.

See also

 Euler angles
 Dzhanibekov effect
 Moment of inertia
 Poinsot's construction
 Rigid rotor

References

 C. A. Truesdell, III (1991) A First Course in Rational Continuum Mechanics. Vol. 1: General Concepts, 2nd ed., Academic Press. . Sects. I.8-10.
 C. A. Truesdell, III and R. A. Toupin (1960) The Classical Field Theories, in S. Flügge (ed.) Encyclopedia of Physics. Vol. III/1: Principles of Classical Mechanics and Field Theory, Springer-Verlag. Sects. 166–168, 196–197, and 294.
 Landau L.D. and Lifshitz E.M. (1976) Mechanics, 3rd. ed., Pergamon Press.
 Goldstein H. (1980) Classical Mechanics, 2nd ed., Addison-Wesley. 
 Symon KR. (1971) Mechanics, 3rd. ed., Addison-Wesley. 

Rigid bodies
Rigid bodies mechanics
Rotation in three dimensions
Equations

de:Eulersche Gleichungen
it:Equazioni di Eulero (dinamica)